Indigofera galegoides is a species of flowering plant in the family Fabaceae, native to India, South East Asia, Malesia, and southern China.

References

galegoides
Flora of India (region)
Flora of Assam (region)
Flora of Bangladesh
Flora of Sri Lanka
Flora of Indo-China
Flora of Malesia
Flora of South-Central China
Flora of Southeast China
Flora of Hainan
Flora of Taiwan
Plants described in 1825